Geryville is a village located mainly in Milford Township, Bucks County but also in Upper Hanover Township, Montgomery County, Pennsylvania, United States. The first letter of the name is pronounced as a hard "g." It is located just north of Route 663 and is split between the East Greenville zip code of 18041 and the Pennsburg zip code of 18073. Originally known as Aurora, the village received its name from the postmaster Jesse Gery in 1865. The Publick House on the corner of Sleepy Hollow Road and Geryville Pike played a prominent role in Fries's Rebellion of 1799. It is drained via the Macoby Creek southward into the Perkiomen Creek and Schuylkill River.

Gallery

References

External links
Jamison Publick House Jamison Publick House – Restaurant - Pennsburg, PA

External links

Unincorporated communities in Bucks County, Pennsylvania
Unincorporated communities in Montgomery County, Pennsylvania
Unincorporated communities in Pennsylvania